ID; Peace B is the debut Korean-language studio album by South Korean singer BoA, released on August 25, 2000 by SM Entertainment. Commercially, it was only moderately successful in South Korea, peaking at number 16 on the Recording Industry Association of Korea's monthly album chart, and sold 156,354 copies in 2000, making it the 59th best-selling album of the year in the country. The album was released on May 29, 2002 in Japan, where it reached number 30 on the Oricon Albums Chart.

Production and lyrics
The song "Sara" is about a cat, "I'm Sorry" is about the tragedy of loving the lover of her older sister, and "ID; Peace B" is about the generation gap due to the use of the internet.

Track listing

Charts

Weekly charts

Monthly charts

Year-end charts

Release history

References

BoA albums
2000 debut albums
SM Entertainment albums
Korean-language albums